Hassan Akkad is a Syrian refugee, photographer, filmmaker and refugee rights activist in the United Kingdom.

Life

Syria
He is originally from Damascus, and worked as an English teacher and photographer. In 2011, as protests in Syria against the government of Bashar al-Assad grew, he joined in and filmed the demonstrations. In response to his taking part, the authorities arrested and beat him twice. After his first period of incarceration, al-Assad invited him to have a conversation, where Akkad told him "about the systemic torture of his [Assad's] regime".

Moving to the UK
In September 2015, he fled Syria and arrived in the UK, a journey which took 87 days. He travelled via Turkey and the Calais Jungle, before using a fake passport to fly to Heathrow, where he claimed asylum. He first lived in Hitchin for two months, before moving into a spare room in Brixton.

Since arriving in the UK, he has worked in TV and film production, and has also worked doing marketing for a refugee charity.

Akkad filmed his journey to the UK, and this footage was used in the BBC documentary, Exodus: Our Journey to Europe which won the BAFTA award for Best Factual Series or Strand in 2017. Akkad raised the issue of how many refugees had died trying to enter Europe when invited to join director James Bluemel at his acceptance speech.

In July 2020, he worked with Marc Quinn in creating and installing the statue A Surge of Power (Jen Reid) 2020 to replace the one of Edward Colston in Bristol.

Coronavirus

Following the start of the COVID-19 pandemic in the UK, he started working as a cleaner for the NHS at Whipps Cross Hospital in East London. While working in the hospital, he took photos of his colleagues, which were published on the Politico website.

Akkad stated that "everyone [he worked with] felt completely betrayed, [and] stabbed in the back" in response to the government announcing that NHS cleaners and porters wouldn't be included in an NHS bereavement scheme if they die due to coronavirus, and that immigrant NHS workers would still have to pay a £400 immigration health surcharge. In response, he filmed a message to UK Prime Minister Boris Johnson, which he published on Twitter, explaining that he was "shocked to find out that your Government decided to exclude myself and my colleagues who work as cleaners and porters and social care workers [from the scheme] ... so if I die from coronavirus my partner isn’t allowed indefinite leave to remain". Following this video, the government made a U-turn, and included these workers in the bereavement scheme. The Observer argued that this video was "directly instrumental in another of the prime minister’s mumbled U-turns the following day", and British Vogue described how he then appeared on Good Morning Britain, and on newspaper front pages, due to this video.

Akkad stated that although he appreciates the Clap for Our Carers events, as they have made communities closer, he "cringe[s]" when he sees government members clapping, due to their handling of the pandemic.

In an interview in August 2020, he explained that having experienced authoritarianism in Syria, he was becoming worried about "the creeping authoritarianism [which] is quite vivid here now", pointing out the "contracts going to government cronies; politicians breaking the rules and not facing consequences; this delusional democracy where people are lied to, and vote for the liars".

He has started writing a memoir, which will be published in 2021 by Pan Macmillan.

Personal life
He is engaged to a Syrian woman he met in the UK, who was there as a student and whose home in Damascus was bombed. They were meant to get married in July 2020 in Leytonstone. His family also left Syria: his parents now live in the UAE, and his brother works for the World Food Programme in Yemen.

In September 2022, Akkad was naturalized as a British citizen.

References

External links
 
 

Syrian refugees
Living people
Labour Party (UK) people
National Health Service people
Syrian photographers
BAFTA winners (people)
Place of birth missing (living people)
Syrian emigrants to the United Kingdom
1988 births